The Ali Akbar College of Music (AACM) is the name of three schools founded by Indian musician Ali Akbar Khan to teach Indian classical music. The first was founded in 1956 in Calcutta, India. The second was founded in 1967 in Berkeley, California, but moved to its current location in San Rafael, California the next year. The third was founded in 1985 in Basel, Switzerland, and is run by Khan's disciple Ken Zuckerman.

In 2003, a collection from the AACM's sound archives formed one of the 50 "culturally, historically, or aesthetically significant" recorded works chosen by the Library of Congress to be added to the National Recording Registry. Among these AACM recordings were live performances by Allauddin Khan, Kishan Maharaj, Nikhil Banerjee and Alla Rakha.

Notable students
Vic Briggs, British blues and rock musician
David R. Courtney, artist, writer, and Green Party politician
Marco Eneidi, free jazz saxophonist
Julian Lage, guitarist and composer
Arthur Russell, composer, producer, and vocalist
Derek Trucks, guitarist, bandleader, and songwriter

See also
 Delhi Music Academy
 Eastern fare music foundation
 Kinnara School of Music

References

External links
 San Rafael, CA, USA AACM
 Basel, Switzerland AACM
 Eastern Fare Music Foundation, Bangalore

Universities and colleges in Kolkata
Universities and colleges in Marin County, California
Music schools in Switzerland
Music schools in India
Educational institutions established in 1956
Educational institutions established in 1967
Educational institutions established in 1985
Education in San Rafael, California
Buildings and structures in San Rafael, California
1967 establishments in California
1956 establishments in West Bengal
1985 establishments in Switzerland
Private universities and colleges in California